Rossie may refer to:

Places
 Rossie, Fife, Scotland
 Rossie, Iowa, United States
 Rossie, New York, United States
 Rossie Island, Angus Scotland; see Ferryden
 Rossie Priory, a country house and estate in Perthshire, Scotland

People
 Bob Rosburg (nicknamed "Rossie"; 1926–2009), American golfer and sports color analyst
 Simon Ross (nicknamed "Rossie"), British radio personality
 Rossie D. Alston Jr. (born 1957), United States District Judge

Other uses
 Baron Rossie, a title in the Peerage of the United Kingdom
 Hutchison baronets, of Rossie
 Rossie (1807 ship), American schooner captured by the British in 1813

See also
 Rossi (disambiguation)